Tetracha germaini is a species of tiger beetle that was described by Chaudoir in 1865, and can be found in Argentina and Bolivia.

References

Cicindelidae
Beetles described in 1865
Beetles of South America